Platysphinx piabilis is a moth of the family Sphingidae first described by William Lucas Distant in 1897. It is known from savanna and other open habitats in southern and eastern Africa.

References

Platysphinx
Moths described in 1897
Moths of Sub-Saharan Africa
Lepidoptera of Mozambique
Lepidoptera of Malawi
Lepidoptera of Tanzania
Lepidoptera of Zimbabwe